This article describes the first and second round of the 2012–13 EHF Women's Champions League.

Format
The 16 teams were split into four groups, consisting of four teams. Each team played a home and away game against all opponents in the group. The first two ranked teams advanced to the main round.

Group matches

Seedings
The draw of the group matches was held on July 6 at the Gartenhotel Altmannsdorf in Vienna. A total of sixteen teams were concerned in the process, to be divided into four pots of four. Teams were divided into four pots, based on EHF coefficients. Clubs from the same pot or the same association could not be drawn into the same group, except the wild card tournament winner, which did not enjoy any protection.

Group A

Group B

Group C

Group D

Main round
The draw of the group matches was held on November 20 at the Gartenhotel Altmannsdorf in Vienna. A total of eight teams were concerned in the process, to be divided into two pots of four. Teams were divided into two pots, based on EHF coefficients. Clubs from the same pot or group could not be drawn into the same group.

Seedings

Group 1

Group 2

References

External links
Official website

2012–13 Women's EHF Champions League